Darreh Mirza (also Romanized as Darreh Mīrzā) is a village in Khezel-e Sharqi Rural District, Khezel District, Nahavand County, Hamadan Province, Iran. At the 2006 census, its population was 349, in 81 families.

References 

Populated places in Nahavand County